Villeret is a commune in the Aisne department in Hauts-de-France in northern France.

Population

History
During the first World War, Villeret was under German occupation. Citizens of Villeret secretly sheltered a group of British soldiers who had become detached from their units in September 1914.  Four of the men were discovered by the Germans and executed in 1916.  This story was the subject of the 2011 book "The Englishman's Daughter / A True Story of Love and Betrayal in World War I" by Ben Macintyre.  The early chapters of the book contain information on the history of Villeret.

See also
 Communes of the Aisne department

References

External links

 View of Villeret on Wikimapia

Communes of Aisne
Aisne communes articles needing translation from French Wikipedia